Francesco Costantino (born 20 September 1972) is an Italian wrestler. He competed in the men's Greco-Roman 48 kg at the 1996 Summer Olympics.

References

External links
 

1972 births
Living people
Italian male sport wrestlers
Olympic wrestlers of Italy
Wrestlers at the 1996 Summer Olympics
Sportspeople from Bari